Marta Makowska is a Polish wheelchair fencer who has won multiple medals for her country at the Paralympic Games, including four at the 2000 Games in Sydney, Australia.

Career
Marta Makowska (née Wyrzykowska) was born in Warsaw, Poland, on 13 July 1977. She attended Cardinal Stefan Wyszynski University in Warsaw where she studied life science. Outside of wheelchair fencing, which she took up as a teenager, Makowska works is a government employee at the District Family Assistance Centre in Wolomin.

At her first Paralympic Games in 2000 in Sydney, Australia, Makowska won four gold medals in the wheelchair fencing. This included a 15–4 defeat of Hungary's Judit Palfi in the Women's épée individual B, as well as the individual foil and both team events. She won a further two bronze medals at the 2004 Paralympic Games in Athens, Greece, and another bronze at the 2012 Games in London, England.

Makowska was awarded the Order of Merit of the Republic of Poland in 2013 by Bronislaw Komorowski, President of Poland.

Personal life
Marta is married to Adam Makowski. Shortly before attending the 2008 Paralympic Games, Makowska discovered that she was pregnant, later giving birth to a girl.

References

Living people
Paralympic wheelchair fencers of Poland
1977 births
Wheelchair fencers at the 2000 Summer Paralympics
Wheelchair fencers at the 2004 Summer Paralympics
Wheelchair fencers at the 2008 Summer Paralympics
Wheelchair fencers at the 2012 Summer Paralympics
Paralympic gold medalists for Poland
Paralympic bronze medalists for Poland
Fencers from Warsaw
Polish female fencers
Medalists at the 2000 Summer Paralympics
Medalists at the 2004 Summer Paralympics
Medalists at the 2012 Summer Paralympics
Paralympic medalists in wheelchair fencing
20th-century Polish women
21st-century Polish women